On October 20, 1847 Captain Elie A. F. La Vallette of the first-class frigate USS Congress in company with the sloop USS Portsmouth forced the Mexican garrison of Guaymas to evacuate the city under the threat of bombardment, then dismantled the seaward defenses of the city and thereafter controlled the city by the threat of bombardment by a sloop of war kept on station at the mouth of the harbor.

Threat of bombardment of the fort and city of Guaymas by the two ships under Captain Elie A. F. La Vallette led to secret evacuation of the Mexican garrison and artillery at night by Col. Antonio Campuzano. Following the bombardment of the fort and city in the morning, La Vallette landed to take possession, to find the city abandoned by its defenders and most its population. With insufficient force to occupy the city, La Vallette demolished the seaward defenses of the port and left the sloop USS Portsmouth offshore to dominate the port with its guns, and collect the tariff, tonnage and ad valorem duties from ships entering the port.

See also
 Pacific Coast Campaign

References

Guaymas
Guaymas
Gulf of California
Guaymas
October 1847 events